Edward Michael Hanyzewski (September 18, 1920 – October 8, 1991) was an American professional baseball player, a right-handed pitcher who worked in 58 games (25 as a starting pitcher) in the Major Leagues between 1942 and 1946 for the Chicago Cubs.

Hanyzewski's best Major League season came in 1943, when he appeared in 33 games (16 as a starter), won eight of 15 decisions, and fashioned a 2.56 earned run average in 130 innings pitched with three complete games.

Hanyzewski pitched in only two games (one in April and one in September) for the 1945 Cubs, who won the National League pennant, and did not appear in the 1945 World Series.

During his MLB career, Hanyzewski allowed 213 hits and 79 bases on balls in 218 innings pitched, with 81 strikeouts. He did not record a save.

References

External links

1920 births
1991 deaths
Baseball players from Indiana
Chicago Cubs players
Major League Baseball pitchers
Notre Dame Fighting Irish baseball players
Milwaukee Brewers (minor league) players
Nashville Vols players
People from LaPorte County, Indiana
Tulsa Oilers (baseball) players